This article includes a partial list of countries by economic freedom that shows the top 50 highest ranking countries and regions from two reports on economic freedom.

 The Economic Freedom of the World Index is a report published by the Fraser Institute in conjunction with the Economic Freedom Network, a Canadian group of independent research and educational institutes in 90 nations and territories worldwide.

 The Index of Economic Freedom is an annual report published by American based on The Heritage Foundation and The Wall Street Journal.  Countries and regions are assessed as free, mostly free, moderately free, mostly unfree, and repressed.

List

References

External links
 Heritage Foundation Index of Economic Freedom web page
 Fraser Institute Economic Freedom of the World web page & archive

Freedom
Freedom
Economic freedom